Jack et Jim, sold in the United States as Jack and Jim and in Britain as Comical Conjuring, is a 1903 French short silent film by Georges Méliès. It was sold by Méliès's Star Film Company and is numbered 517–519 in its catalogues.

Méliès plays the juggler in the film, which uses substitution splices and gunfire for its special effects.

References

External links
 

French black-and-white films
Films directed by Georges Méliès
French silent short films